Irakli Sirbiladze (born September 27, 1982) is a Georgian footballer, who represents JIPPO.

Honors

 Ykkönen player of the year (2010)
 Ykkönen best goalscorer (2010)
 Veikkausliiga Striker of the year (2012)

International Call-Ups

Correct as of 4 September 2013

References

Sirbiladze palaa Vihreisiin!, kpv.fi, 5 January 2016

External links
 Playerhistory Profile
 

Footballers from Georgia (country)
FF Jaro players
Veikkausliiga players
Ykkönen players
Erovnuli Liga players
Expatriate footballers from Georgia (country)
Expatriate footballers in Finland
Living people
1983 births
Georgia (country) international footballers
Footballers from Tbilisi
Association football forwards
AC Kajaani players
Kuopion Palloseura players
Kokkolan Palloveikot players
FC Inter Turku players
FC Lokomotivi Tbilisi players
FC Dinamo Batumi players
FC Metalurgi Rustavi players
FC Sioni Bolnisi players